Dialog is an online information service owned by ProQuest, who acquired it from Thomson Reuters in mid-2008.

Dialog was one of the predecessors of the World Wide Web as a provider of information, though not in form. The earliest form of the Dialog system was completed in 1966 in Lockheed Martin under the direction of Roger K. Summit.  According to its literature, it was "the world's first online information retrieval system to be used globally with materially significant databases". In the 1980s, a low-priced dial-up version of a subset of Dialog was marketed to individual users as Knowledge Index. This subset included INSPEC, MathSciNet, over 200 other bibliographic and reference databases, as well as third-party retrieval vendors who would go to physical libraries to copy materials for a fee and send it to the service subscriber.

While being owned by the Thomson Corporation, Dialog consisted of the Dialog, DataStar, Profound, and NewsEdge businesses.  Dialog and DataStar were consolidated into Dialog.  The news content from Profound and NewsEdge were consolidated, and the market research business from Profound was sold to MarketResearch.com.  The NewsEdge business was eventually sold to Acquire Media, now Naviga.  Prior to being owned by Thomson, MAID purchased Knight-Ridder Information which included the Dialog and DataStar businesses.  MAID renamed itself to be the Dialog Corporation.

See also 
Colorado Alliance of Research Libraries

References

External links
 Dialog Solutions
Dialog
Former assets of Thomson Reuters
Online databases
Online companies of the United States
Bibliographic databases and indexes
Patent search services
Pre–World Wide Web online services
Full-text scholarly online databases
Scholarly search services